The phonology of Bengali, like that of its neighbouring Eastern Indo-Aryan languages, is characterised by a wide variety of diphthongs and inherent back vowels (both  and ).

Phonemic inventory

Phonemically, Bengali features 29 consonants and 7 vowels. Each vowel has examples of being nasalized in Bengali words, thus adding 7 more additional nasalized vowels. In the tables below, the sounds are given in IPA.

Although the standard form of Bengali is largely uniform across West Bengal and Bangladesh, there are a few sounds that vary in pronunciation (in addition to the myriad variations in non-standard dialects):

Consonant clusters

Native Bengali ( tôdbhôbo) words do not allow initial consonant clusters; the maximum syllabic structure is CVC (i.e. one vowel flanked by a consonant on each side). Many speakers of Bengali restrict their phonology to this pattern, even when using Sanskrit or English borrowings, such as  geram (CV.CVC) for  gram (CCVC) meaning 'village' or  iskul / ishkul (VC.CVC) for  skul (CCVC) 'school'.

Sanskrit ( tôtshômo) words borrowed into Bengali, however, possess a wide range of clusters, expanding the maximum syllable structure to CCCVC. English and other foreign ( bideshi) borrowings add even more cluster types into the Bengali inventory, further increasing the syllable capacity, as commonly-used loanwords such as  ṭren ('train') and  glash ('glass') are now included in leading Bengali dictionaries.

Final consonant clusters are rare in Bengali. Most final consonant clusters were borrowed into Bengali from English, as in  lifṭ ('elevator') and  beņk ("bank'). However, final clusters do exist in some native Bengali words, although rarely in standard pronunciation. One example of a final cluster in a standard Bengali word would be  gônj, which is found in names of hundreds of cities and towns across Bengal, including  Nôbabgônj and  Manikgônj. Some nonstandard varieties of Bengali make use of final clusters quite often. For example, in some Purbo (eastern) dialects, final consonant clusters consisting of a nasal and its corresponding oral stop are common, as in  chand ('moon'). The Standard Bengali equivalent of chand would be  chãd, with a nasalized vowel instead of the final cluster.

Diphthongs

Magadhan languages such as Bengali are known for their wide variety of diphthongs, or combinations of vowels occurring within the same syllable. The semivowels  may all form the glide part of a diphthong. The total number of diphthongs is not established, with bounds at 17 and 31. Several vowel combinations can be considered true monosyllabic diphthongs, made up of the main vowel (the nucleus) and the trailing vowel (the off-glide). Almost all other vowel combinations are possible, but only across two adjacent syllables, such as the disyllabic vowel combination  in  kua ('well'). As many as 25 vowel combinations can be found, but some of the more recent combinations have not passed through the stage between two syllables and a diphthongal monosyllable.

Prosody

Stress
In standard Bengali, stress is predominantly initial. Bengali words are virtually all trochaic; the primary stress falls on the initial syllable of the word, while secondary stress often falls on all odd-numbered syllables thereafter, giving strings such as  shôhojogita  ('cooperation'). The first syllable carries the greatest stress, with the third carrying a somewhat weaker stress, and all following odd-numbered syllables carrying very weak stress. However, in words borrowed from Sanskrit, the root syllable has stress, out of harmony with the situation with native Bengali words. Also, in a declarative sentence, the stress is generally lowest on the last word of the sentence.

Adding prefixes to a word typically shifts the stress to the left; for example, while the word  shobbho  ('civilized') carries the primary stress on the first syllable, adding the negative prefix  creates  ôshobbho  ('uncivilized'), where the primary stress is now on the newly added first syllable  ô. Word-stress does not alter the meaning of a word and is always subsidiary to sentence-level stress.

Intonation
For Bengali words, intonation or pitch of voice have minor significance, apart from a few cases such as distinguishing between identical vowels in a diphthong. However, in sentences intonation does play a significant role. In a simple declarative sentence, most words and/or phrases in Bengali carry a rising tone, with the exception of the last word in the sentence, which only carries a low tone. This intonational pattern creates a musical tone to the typical Bengali sentence, with low and high tones alternating until the final drop in pitch to mark the end of the sentence.

In sentences involving focused words and/or phrases, the rising tones only last until the focused word; all following words carry a low tone. This intonation pattern extends to wh-questions, as wh-words are normally considered to be focused. In yes-no questions, the rising tones may be more exaggerated, and most importantly, the final syllable of the final word in the sentence takes a high falling tone instead of a flat low tone.

Vowel length
Like most Magadhan languages, vowel length is not contrastive in Bengali; all else equal, there is no meaningful distinction between a "short vowel" and a "long vowel", unlike the situation in most Indo-Aryan languages. However, when morpheme boundaries come into play, vowel length can sometimes distinguish otherwise homophonous words. This is because open monosyllables (i.e. words that are made up of only one syllable, with that syllable ending in the main vowel and not a consonant) can have somewhat longer vowels than other syllable types. For example, the vowel in ca ('tea') can be somewhat longer than the first vowel in caṭa ('licking'), as ca is a word with only one syllable, and no final consonant. The suffix ṭa ('the') can be added to ca to form caṭa ('the tea'), and the long vowel is preserved, creating a minimal pair ( vs. ). Knowing this fact, some interesting cases of apparent vowel length distinction can be found. In general, Bengali vowels tend to stay away from extreme vowel articulation.

Furthermore, using a form of reduplication called "echo reduplication", the long vowel in ca can be copied into the reduplicant ṭa, giving caṭa ('tea and all that comes with it'). Thus, in addition to caṭa ('the tea') with a longer first vowel and caṭa ('licking') with no long vowels, we have caṭa ('tea and all that comes with it') with two longer vowels.

Regional phonological variations

The phonological alternations of Bengali vary greatly due to the dialectal differences between the speech of Bengalis living on the western (Poschim) side and eastern (Purbo) side of Padma River.

Affricates and Fricatives
In the dialects prevalent in much of eastern and south-eastern Bangladesh (Barisal, Chittagong, Dhaka and Sylhet Divisions of Bangladesh), many of the stops and affricates heard in the West Bengal dialects are pronounced as fricatives. Western Palato-alveolar and alveolo-palatal affricates  [~],  [~],  [~] correspond to eastern  [],  [~].

The aspirated velar stop  , the unvoiced aspirated labial stop   and the voiced aspirated labial stop   of Poshcim/western Bengali dialects correspond to  [~],  [~] and  [~] in many dialects of Purbo/eastern Bengali. These pronunciations are more prevalent in the Sylheti of northeastern Bangladesh and south Assam, the language spoken by most of the Bengali community in the United Kingdom.

Tibeto-Burman influence

However, on the far eastern Bengali, Tibeto-Burman influence makes the distinction less clear, and it sometimes becomes similar to the phonology of the Assamese ৰ rô [].

Some variants on the Bengali branch, particularly the Chittagonian, and Sylheti, have contrastive tone and so differences in pitch can distinguish words.

See also
 Bengali alphabet

References

Bibliography

 
 
 
 
 
 
 

Bengali language
Indo-Aryan phonologies